Manuel Gato Thomason (born 28 January 1984 in Alicante, Valencian Community) is a Spanish footballer who plays for Racing CF Benidorm as a forward.

External links

1984 births
Living people
Spanish footballers
Footballers from Alicante
Association football forwards
La Liga players
Segunda División players
Segunda División B players
Tercera División players
Divisiones Regionales de Fútbol players
Atlético Albacete players
Albacete Balompié players
Pontevedra CF footballers
Alicante CF footballers
UB Conquense footballers
CD Alcoyano footballers
CE Sabadell FC footballers
Hércules CF players
Novelda CF players
Spain youth international footballers